The following is a list of notable deaths in February 1999.

Entries for each day are listed alphabetically by surname. A typical entry lists information in the following sequence:
 Name, age, country of citizenship at birth, subsequent country of citizenship (if applicable), reason for notability, cause of death (if known), and reference.

February 1999

1
Marion Boyars, 71, British book publisher, pancreatic cancer.
Paul Calvert, 81, Canadian baseball player.
Alejandro Galindo, 93, Mexican screenwriter and film director.
Hank Harris, 75, American gridiron football player.
Rudolf Kárpáti, 78, Hungarian fencer and Olympic champion.
Barış Manço, 56, Turkish rock musician, actor, and show host, heart attack.
Paul Mellon, 91, American philanthropist.
Robin Nedwell, 52, British actor, heart attack.
St. Clair Pinckney, 68, American saxophonist.
Harold E. Shear, 80, United States Navy admiral.
Benjamin Elazari Volcani, 84, Israeli microbiologist.
Julius Wechter, 63, American musician and composer, cancer.

2
Marie Van Brittan Brown, 76, American nurse and inventor.
Michel Mathiot, 72, French gymnast and Olympian.
David McComb, 36, Australian rock musician, heart failure.
August Neuburger, 96, German politician and member of the Bundestag.
Vladimír Petlák, 52, Czech volleyball player and Olympic medalist.
Vilmos Tátrai, 86, Hungarian classical violinist .
Tunku Puan Besar Kurshiah, 87, Malayan queen of Negeri Sembilan.

3
Norman Bluhm, 77, American painter, heart failure.
Luc Borrelli, 33, French football player, traffic collision.
William C. Brown, 82, American electrical engineer.
Jim Cope, 91, Australian politician.
Alexei Gorokhov, 71, Soviet violinist.
Gwen Guthrie, 48, American singer-songwriter and pianist, uterine cancer.
Mikko Hietanen, 87, Finnish long-distance runner, European Champion and world record holder.
Alfred Janes, 87, Welsh artist.
Herbert Klynn, 81, American animator.
Yu Qiuli, 84, Chinese Army general and politician.
John S. Service, 89, American diplomat.
Vin Sullivan, 87, American comic book editor, artist and publisher.

4
Luigi Bernabò Brea, 88, Italian archaeologist.
Erich Hartmann, 76, German-American photographer.
Joe Hayes, 63, English football player.
Arthur Mann, 51, Scottish football player.
Vittorio Marzotto, 76, Italian racing driver.
Sean Sellers, 29, American juvenile convict, execution by lethal injection.

5
Neville Bonner, 76, Australian politician, first indigenous Member of Parliament.
John L. Cotter, 87, American archaeologist, cancer.
Rembert Delden, 81, German politician member of the Bundestag.
Leo Echegaray, 38, Filipino convict, execution by lethal injection.
Nicholas Krushenick, 69, American abstract painter, liver cancer.
Wassily Leontief, 93, Russian economist and Nobel Prize laureate.
Mariya Osipova, 90, Soviet partisan during World War II.
Indrani Rahman, 68, Indian classical dancer.
Linda Sini, 74, Italian film actress.

6
Thomas Banyacya, 89, American Native American traditional leader.
Erwin Blask, 88, German athlete.
Henry S. Clark, 95, American horse trainer.
Danny Dayton, 75, American actor and television director, emphysema.
Don Dunstan, 72, Australian politician, lung cancer.
Yuriy Istomin, 54, Ukrainian footballer.
Jimmy Roberts, 74, American singer and performer, bone cancer.

7
Hussein I of Jordan, 63, Jordanian monarch, King of Jordan (1952–1999), lymphoma.
Andrew Keller, 73, British scientist.
William Ludwig, 86, American screenwriter, Parkinson's disease.
Umberto Maglioli, 70, Italian racing driver.
Antonio Pacenza, 70, Argentine boxer.
George E. Shambaugh Jr., 95, American otolaryngologist and pioneer in deafness treatments.
Bobby Troup, 80, American actor, jazz pianist, singer and songwriter.

8
Richard Boone, 68, American jazz trombonist and scat singer.
Meredith Edwards, 81, Welsh actor and writer.
Madeleine Frieden-Kinnen, 83, Luxembourgian politician.
Per Knudsen, 73, Danish football player.
Iris Murdoch, 79, Irish-born British novelist, poet and philosopher, Alzheimer's disease.
Caroline Robbins, 95, British historian.
Krishnaswamy Sundarji, 70, British Indian Army officer.
Giuseppe Tatarella, 63, Italian politician, heart attack.

9
Richard Allen, 66, British abstract artist and printmaker, amyotrophic lateral sclerosis.
Benjamin Bwalya, 37, Zambian footballer and coach, cerebral malaria.
Enzo Forcella, 77, Italian essayist, historian and journalist.
Aleksander Gieysztor, 82, Polish medievalist historian.
Mary LaRoche, 78, American actress and singer.
Len Levy, 77, American athlete.
Bryan Mosley, 67, British television and film actor, (Coronation Street), heart attack.
Bernhard Paus, 88, Norwegian orthopedic surgeon.
Jaturun Siripongs, 47, Thai murderer, execution by lethal injection.
Inga-Stina Robson, 79, Anglo-Swedish political activist.

10
Ashley Bramall, 83, British politician.
Robert Clothier, 77, Canadian actor.
Hernán Santa Cruz, 93, Chilean diplomat and United Nations delegate.
Joan Curran, 82, Welsh scientist, cancer.
Ann-Marie Gyllenspetz, 66, Swedish actress.
Billy Houliston, 77, Scottish footballer.
Joe M. Kilgore, 80, American combat pilot during World War II and politician.
Herb Krautblatt, 72, American basketball player.
Jean Levavasseur, 74, French fencer.
Y. B. Mangunwijaya, 69, Indonesian architect, writer and Catholic religious leader.
Gideon Rafael, 86, Israeli diplomat.

11
William Alonso, 66, Argentinian-American planner and economist.
Leonard J. Arrington, 81, American Mormon historian, heart failure.
Danny Barber, 43, American serial killer, execution by lethal injection.
John Brack, 78, Australian painter.
Jaki Byard, 76, American jazz musician, composer and arranger, homicide by gunshot.
Toni Fisher, 74, American pop singer, heart attack.
Stoyan Gadev, 67, Bulgarian actor.
Werner Korff, 87, German ice hockey player and Olympic medalist.
Dragan Kovačić, 59, Yugoslav-Croatian basketball player.
Rose Mbowa, 56, Ugandan writer, actress, academic and feminist.
Hugh McCullough, 82, American gridiron football player.
Brian Parsons, 65, English cricket player.
Xiao Qian, 89, Chinese essayist, editor and journalist.
Nikolai Sergeyev, 89, Soviet admiral.
Whitney Tower, 75, American Thoroughbred horse racing journalist, complications from a stroke.

12
Paul Bairoch, 68, Belgin-Swiss economic historian.
André Devigny, 82, French soldier and member of the Résistance.
Jimmy Dudley, 89, American baseball player and sportscaster.
Rexhep Krasniqi, 92, Albanian-American historian, nationalist, anti-communist politician and activist.
Heinz Schubert, 73, German actor, drama teacher and photographer, pneumonia.
Michel Seuphor, 97, Belgian painter.

13
Peko Dapčević, 85, Yugoslav communist.
Michael Higgins, 90, American glass artist.
Kåre Hovda, 55, Norwegian biathlete and Olympian.
Gary Jennings, 70, American author, heart failure.
Ron McLean, 60, Australian politician, asbestos-related lung condition.
Carles Sabater, 36, Catalan singer and actor, respiratory arrest.

14
Sam Bartholomew, 81, American gridiron football player.
John Ehrlichman, 73, United States Domestic Policy Council and Watergate scandal conspirator, diabetes.
Buddy Knox, 65, American singer and songwriter, lung cancer.
Hillel Seidel, 78, Israeli politician.
Joseph Francis Shea, 73, American aerospace engineer and NASA manager.
Raymond Thompson, 87, American competition swimmer and Olympian.
Majken Åberg, 80, Swedish discus thrower and Olympian.

15
Agnes Bernelle, 75, Berlin-born expatriate actress and singer.
Jeffery Cohelan, 84, American politician and political activist.
Billy Garrett, 65, American racecar driver.
Henry Way Kendall, 72, American physicist and recipient of the Nobel Prize in Physics, drowned.
Aigars Kriķis, 44, Soviet and Latvian luger.
Big L, 24, American Freestyle rapper (D.I.T.C.), murdered.
Gordon Neil Stewart, 86, Australian writer.
Ferenc Vozar, 53, Hungarian ice hockey player and Olympic medalist.

16
Björn Afzelius, 52, Swedish progg singer and guitarist, lung cancer.
Necil Kazım Akses, 90, Turkish classical composer.
Guillermo Arellano, 90, Chilean football player.
Fritzi Burger, 88, Austrian figure skater.
Petre Crowder, 79, British barrister and politician.
Ugo Grappasonni, 76, Italian professional golfer.
Herbert S. Green, 78, British–Australian physicist.
James Hill, 74, British politician.
Henk Hofstra, 94, Dutch politician.
Johan Kvandal, 79, Norwegian composer.
Michael Larson, 49, American game show contestant, throat cancer.
Alexandre-Athenase Noghès, 82, Monegasque tennis player and husband of Princess Antoinette of Monaco.
Bailey Olter, 66, Micronesian political figure.
Betty Roché, 81, American blues singer.

17
Thomas James Carr, 89, British artist.
Kurt Robert Eissler, 90, Austrian psychoanalyst.
Jaime Hurtado, 62, Ecuadorian politician, murdered.
William D. McElroy, 82, American biochemist and academic.
Sunshine Parker, 71, American actor, pneumonia.
Shirley Stoler, 69, American actress, heart failure.
Tania, 105, Spanish tango singer known as "Tania".
R.S. Unni, 73, Indian politician and trade unionist.

18
Felipe Alfau, 96, Spanish-American novelist and poet.
Andreas Feininger, 92, American photographer.
Tibor Házi, 87, Hungarian table tennis player.
Nikolay Latyshev, 85, Soviet and Russian football player and referee.
Olle Nordemar, 84, Swedish cinematographer, screenwriter, film director and producer.
Noam Pitlik, 66, American actor and television director, lung cancer.

19
Mohammad Mohammad Sadeq al-Sadr, 55, Iraqi Shia marja', murdered.
Khumar Barabankvi, 79, Indian Urdu poet and lyricist.
Wilford Berry, Jr., 36, American convicted murderer, execution by lethal injection.
Robert Coulson, 70, American science fiction writer and bookseller.
Trudy Desmond, 53, Canadian jazz singer.
Richard E. Dutrow, Sr., 61, American thoroughbred racehorse trainer.
Lloyd La Beach, 76, Panamanian sprinter, 100 meters world record holder (1948) and Olympian.
Lady Pansy Lamb, 94, English writer also known as "Pansy Pakenham".
Georg Meier, 88, German motorcycle racer.
Primo Miller, 83, American gridiron football player.
Constantin Oțet, 58, Romanian football coach.
Paul Schmidt, American actor, poet, playwright and essayist.

20
Howard Boatwright, 80, American composer, violinist and musicologist.
Willard R. Espy, 88, American philologist, writer and poet.
Lotti van der Gaag, 75, Dutch sculptor and painter.
Frans Grootjans, 77, Belgian politician and minister.
Molly Harrower, 93, American clinical psychologist.
Sarah Kane, 28, English playwright, suicide by hanging.
Al Krueger, 79, American gridiron football player.
Michael Sgan-Cohen, 54, Israeli artist, art historian, curator and critic.
Gene Siskel, 53, American film critic and television journalist, brain cancer.

21
Gertrude B. Elion, 81, American biochemist, pharmacologist and Nobel Prize recipient .
Hideo Itokawa, 86, Japanese aircraft designer and rocketry pioneer.
Ilmari Juutilainen, 85, Finnish flying ace during World War II.
Kaya, 38, Mauritian musician and creator of the seggae genre.
Walter Lini, 57, Prime Minister of Vanuatu.
Wilmer Mizell, 68, American athlete and politician.
Jørgen Leschly Sørensen, 76, Danish footballer.
Leyla Vakilova, 72, Azerbaijani ballerina and ballet teacher.

22
Bitto Albertini, 74, Italian film director and screenwriter.
William Bronk, 81, American poet.
Charles Gerhardt, 72, American conductor, record producer, and arranger.
Howie Haak, 87, American baseball scout.
Carlos Hathcock, 56, United States Marine Corps sniper, multiple sclerosis.
Menno Oosting, 34, Dutch tennis player, car accident.
Pat Upton, 54, Irish politician and veterinarian, heart attack.

23
Sir Anthony Nutting, 3rd Baronet, 79, British diplomat and politician, heart failure.
Stanley Dance, 88, British jazz writer and record producer, pneumonia.
Ruth Gipps, 78, English composer, oboist, pianist, and conductor.
Hughie Lee-Smith, 83, American artist, cancer.
Gershon Legman, 81, American cultural critic and folklorist, complications following a stroke.
Chip Myers, 53, American football player, heart attack.
David Chilton Phillips, 74, British biologist, prostate cancer.
Heinrich Schmid, 77, Swiss linguist.
Rick Wilson, 33, American professional wrestler, suicide.

24
David Daube, 90, German scholar of ancient law.
Andre Dubus, 62, American short story writer and essayist, heart attack.
Virginia Foster Durr, 95, American white civil rights activist and lobbyist.
David Eccles, 1st Viscount Eccles, 94, English politician.
Fathy Ghanem, 74, Egyptian writer.
Enzo Menegotti, 73, Italian football player.
Derek Nimmo, 68, English actor and author, fall.
Catharina Roodzant, 102, Dutch female chess master.
Ahmed Sharif, 78, Bangladeshi philosopher, writer and academic.
Frank Leslie Walcott, 82, Barbadian politician, diplomat and umpire.
Vann "Piano Man" Walls, 80, American R&B musician, cancer.
Johnnie Wittig, 84, American baseball player.

25
Dina Dreyfus, 88, French anthropologist, sociologist, and philosopher.
Murad Ozdoev, 76, Ingush flying ace during World War II.
Sol Schoenbach, 84, American bassoonist and teacher.
Glenn T. Seaborg, 86, American nuclear chemist and recipient of the Nobel Prize in Chemistry (1951), complications of a stroke.
Štěpán Zavřel, 66, Czech painter, graphic artist and writer.

26
Michael Avallone, 74, American author.
Jean Coulomb, 94, French geophysicist and mathematician.
Annibale Frossi, 87, Italian football player and manager.
Elbridge T. Gerry, 90, American banker and polo player.
John L. Goldwater, 83, American comic book editor and publisher.
János Péter, 88, Hungarian politician.
José Quintero, 74, Panamanian theatre director and pedagogue, esophageal cancer.
Opoku Ware II, 79, 15th Emperor-King of the Ashanti people.
Bjørn Wiik, 62, Norwegian physicist, domestic accident.

27
George Hughley, 59, American football player and coach, traffic accident.
Robert McNeish, 86, American football player and coach.
Vida Steinert, 96, New Zealand painter.
Horace Tapscott, 64, American jazz pianist and composer.
Luis Vidal, 82, Chilean football player.

28
Anthea Askey, 65, English actress.
Dave Bedwell, 70, British racing cyclist.
Ara Harutyunyan, 70, Armenian sculptor and graphic artist.
Clarence Henry, 72, American boxer.
Lionel Berry, 2nd Viscount Kemsley, 89, British politician, peer and newspaper editor.
Kenny Robinson, 29, American baseball player, traffic collision.
Bill Talbert, 80, American tennis player.
Bing Xin, 98, Chinese writer.

References 

1999-02
 02